John Felix (fl. 1498) was an English Benedictine monk, belonging to St Peter's Monastery, Westminster.

Felix lived about the middle of the reign of Henry VII; the only record of him that remains is a short manuscript life he wrote of John Estney, abbot of Westminster, 1474–98, and some doggerel Latin verses on the same abbot, setting forth his benefactions to the church of Westminster.

References

Year of birth unknown
Year of death unknown
People of the Tudor period
15th-century English people
English Benedictines